Siekierki  is a village in the administrative district of Gmina Cedynia, within Gryfino County West Pomeranian Voivodeship, in north-western Poland, close to the German border.

For the history of the region, see History of Pomerania.

The village has a population of 173.

Notable residents
 Hans Schilling (aviator) (1892-1916), German World War I pilot

References

Villages in Gryfino County